Wolfboy and the Everything Factory is an animated television series created by Toff Mazery and Edward Jesse for Apple TV+. It premiered on 24 September 2021 as part of a slate of autumn children's series. Season 2 was released on 30 September 2022.

Plot

The series follows Wolfboy, an imaginative oddball who discovers a strange realm at the centre of the earth where fantastical beings called ‘Sprytes’ create things for the world on the surface - clouds, trees, rabbits, dreams, hiccups, memories, time... everything. With the help of his newfound Spryte friends, Xandra and Sprout, Wolfboy learns that not only can he use the creative energy of the Everything Factory to make his wild imagination come to life, but that he is destined to play a central role in an age-old battle between the forces of creation and destruction. He soon comes to realize that being different is what makes him special - and that, ultimately, it’s the oddballs and dreamers who change the world.

Cast

Main Characters 
 Kassian Akhtar as William Wolfe "Wolfboy"
 Archie Yates as Sprout Figwort
 Lilly Williams as Xandra
 Cristina Milizia as Floof
 Joseph Gordon-Levitt as Professor Luxcraft
Abigail Estrella as Seth

Supporting Characters 
Berrett Huntsman as Oneira "Oni"
Nevin Kar as Blip
Isabella Russo as Tali
Flula Borg as Gamekeeper
Courtenay Taylor as Athena
Juno Temple as Nyx
Kevin Michael Richardson as Klaybottom
Maurice LaMarche as Faradox
Joel Gelman as Serebrin
Mae Whitman as Wuji

Other characters   
 David Krumholtz as Professor Rabscuttle
 Jason Maybaum as Sneffton
 John Lithgow as Professor Chronopher
 Georgia King as William's Mom
 Jo Firestone
 Melanie Paxson as Antler
Kirby Howell-Baptiste as Flora Figwort
Kimberly Brooks
Moira Quirk as Amelia "Millie" Springhaart
Justin Vivian Bond as Astralynx "Star Creature"
Monia Ayachi as Mademoiselle Glaçon 
Flula Borg as Monsieur Snjor
Zehra Fazal as Professor Pigment
BJ Ward as Celorain
TBA as Seapinch
Maria Bamford as Sky Ancient
Henry Winkler as Mountain Ancient
Tony Hale as Water Ancient
Lorraine Toussaint as Forest Ancient

Episodes

Season 1 (2021)

Season 2 (2022)

Production
The animation style for the series is based on the visual art of Toff Mazery. Mazery and Edward Jesse are the series' co-creators, writers, and executive producers with Michael Ryan serving as a showrunner, writer, and executive producer. Also executive producing are Joseph Gordon-Levitt and Jared Geller of HitRecord as well as Scott Greenberg and Joel Kuwahara of Bento Box Entertainment.

Release
Apple TV+ released a trailer on 9 September 2021. The series later premiered on September 24, 2021.

Reception
The series was initially met with overwhelmingly positive reviews, with Cult Of Mac praising the "charm[ing]" show for allowing its characters to express a wide range of emotions and comparing it to Steven Universe and Fatherly noting its unique feel and tone while calling it "the next great weird kids’ show". Common Sense Media praised the series as "a true delight", noting the complexity and emotional intelligence of the characters, as well as the "superb" visual world of the Everything Factory.

References

External links
 
 

Apple TV+ original programming
2020s American animated television series
2020s British animated television series
2021 American television series debuts
2021 British television series debuts
American children's animated adventure television series
British children's animated adventure television series
American children's animated fantasy television series
British children's animated fantasy television series
American flash animated television series
British flash animated television series
Animated television series about children
English-language television shows
Works based on art
Apple TV+ children's programming